Filho is a Portuguese suffix of a human name, meaning "junior". Notable people with the suffix include:

Adelmar Faria Coimbra-Filho (1924–2016), Brazilian biologist
Adilson Carlos Tavares Filho (born 1988), Brazilian footballer
Aguinaldo Filho, Brazilian actor
Alfredo Saad-Filho, Brazilian economist
Álvaro Morais Filho (born 1990), Brazilian beach volleyball player
Álvaro dos Santos Filho (born 1911), Brazilian sports shooter
Antônio Amaral Filho (1921–1988), Brazilian swimmer
Armando Monteiro Filho (1925–2018), Brazilian businessman, engineer and politician
Café Filho (1899–1970), Brazilian politician 
Carlos Bittencourt Filho (born 1930), Brazilian sailor
Carlos Chagas Filho (1910–2000), Brazilian physician and biologist
Carlos dos Reis Filho (1906-?), Brazilian hurdler
Casimiro Montenegro Filho (1904—2000), Brazilian army and air force officer
Ciro Nogueira Lima Filho (born 1968), Brazilian lawyer and politician
Daniel Filho (born 1937), Brazilian film producer, director, actor and screenwriter
Domingos Nascimento dos Santos Filho (born 1985), Brazilian footballer
Edison Lobão Filho (born 1964), Brazilian politician and businessman
Ernesto Flores Filho, Brazilian rowing coxswain
Ézio Leal Moraes Filho (1966–2011), Brazilian footballer
Fausto Sucena Rasga Filho (1929–2007), Brazilian basketball player
Fernando Coelho Filho (born 1984), Brazilian businessman and politician
Francisco Filho (born 1971), Brazilian kickboxer
Francisco Filho (born 1940), Brazilian footballer 
Francisco Accioly Rodrigues da Costa Filho (1920–1979), Brazilian lawyer, professor and politician
Garibaldi Alves Filho (born 1947), Brazilian politician
Gilberto Barbosa Nunes Filho (born 1989), Brazilian footballer
Guilherme Catramby Filho (born 1905-?), Brazilian modern pentathlete
Hélio José Muniz Filho, Brazilian criminal
Irênio José Soares Filho (born 1975), Brazilian footballer
Jardel Filho (1928–1983), Brazilian actor
Jean Paulo Fernandes Filho (born 1995), Brazilian footballer 
João Lopes Filho (born c. 1943), Capeverdean anthropologist, historian and novelist
Joaquim Pedro Salgado Filho (1888–1950), Brazilian lawyer and politician
Jorge Luiz Frello Filho, known by his professional name Jorginho, a Brazil-born Italy international footballer
José Carlos Ferreira Filho (born 1983), Brazilian footballer
José Carlos Gomes Filho (born 1979), Brazilian footballer
José de Carvalho Filho (born 1931), Brazilian rower
José Celso de Mello Filho (born 1945), Brazilian jurist
José Filho Duarte (born 1980), Brazilian footballer
José Rezende Filho (1929–1977), Brazilian writer
José Viegas Filho (born 1942), Brazilian diplomat
Kleber Mendonça Filho (born 1968), Brazilian film director, screenwriter, producer and critic
Lourenço Filho (1897–1970), Brazilian educator
Luís Antônio Fleury Filho (born 1949), Brazilian politician, prosecutor and professor
Marçal Justen Filho (born 1955), Brazilian attorney and Law professor
Mário Filho (1908–1966), Brazilian journalist and writer
Mauro Mendonça Filho (born 1965), Brazilian television director
Mendonça Filho (born 1966), Brazilian businessman and politician
Miguel Fenelon Câmara Filho (1925–2018), Brazilian Roman Catholic archbishop
Oduvaldo Vianna Filho (1936–1974), Brazilian playwright
Olímpio Mourão Filho (1900–1972), Brazilian general
Oscar Filho (born 1978), Brazilian actor, comedian, writer and reporter
Osvaldo Lourenço Filho (born 1987), Brazilian footballer
Oswaldo Simões Filho (born 1952), Brazilian judoka
Otávio Frias Filho (1957–2018), Brazilian newspaper editor
Paulo Filho (born 1978), Brazilian mixed martial artist
Paulo Henrique Filho (d. 2017), Brazilian footballer
Paulo Henrique Carneiro Filho (born 1989), Brazilian footballer
Paulo Machado de Carvalho Filho (1924–2010), Brazilian businessman and impresario
Pedro Rodrigues Filho (1954–2023), Brazilian serial killer
Renan Filho (born 1979), Brazilian economist and politician
Roniere Jose Da Silva Filho (born 1986), Portuguese footballer
Salatiel Bartolomeu de Paiva Filho (born 1992), Brazilian footballer
Sálvio Spínola Fagundes Filho (born 1968), Brazilian football referee
Sarney Filho (born 1957), Brazilian lawyer and politician
Sérgio Cabral Filho (born 1963), Brazilian politician and journalist
Tarcísio Filho (born 1964), Brazilian actor
Teotonio Vilela Filho (born 1951), Brazilian economist and politician
Valdo Filho (born 1964), Brazilian footballer
Vital do Rêgo Filho (born 1963), Brazilian politician and doctor

See also
Neto (suffix), another suffix

References